Barrai may refer to:

 Barrai, Berasia, a village in Madhya Pradesh, India
 Barrai, Huzur, a village in Madhya Pradesh, India